Fusarium oxysporum f.sp. cannabis is a fungal plant pathogen infecting hemp.

References

External links
 USDA ARS Fungal Database

oxysporum f.sp. cannabis
Fungal plant pathogens and diseases
Hemp diseases
Forma specialis taxa